Jang-e Sar may refer to:
 Jang-e Sar, Khoy
 Jang-e Sar, Salmas